Samuel Edward Hutchinson (born 3 August 1989) is an English professional footballer who primarily plays as a centre-back or defensive midfielder for  club Reading.

Early and personal life
Hutchinson was born in Windsor, Berkshire, in England. He is the son of Eddie Hutchinson, who had played for Chelsea's youth team, before a career in non-League football. 

As of June 2019, Hutchinson had one daughter and two sons with his wife, Jennifer.

Club career

Chelsea
Hutchinson joined the Chelsea Academy at the age of nine, and made his senior debut in May 2007, at the age of 17. Hutchinson signed a new four-year contract in August 2007. Later that month, Plymouth Argyle manager Ian Holloway announced his interest in signing Hutchinson on loan. Hutchinson retired from professional football at the age of 21 in August 2010, due to a recurring knee injury.

In December 2011 he came out of retirement and signed a new one-and-a-half-year contract with Chelsea following a "significant improvement" with his knee. He made his return as a substitute on 29 April in a 6–1 win over Queens Park Rangers. In August 2012, Hutchinson joined Nottingham Forest on a season-long loan deal.

Loan to Nottingham Forest
On 16 August 2012, Hutchinson signed on loan for Football League Championship side Nottingham Forest. He made his debut on 21 August, in a 1–1 draw away to Huddersfield Town. He scored on his home debut in a 2–1 win against Charlton Athletic on 1 September 2012. Following another knee injury, Hutchinson went back to Chelsea in September for an injection that was intended to clear up the problem by the October international break; the treatment did not work and he was still out through mid-December, missing fifteen games. After a long break, Hutchinson returned to training with Forest at the beginning of the March 2013.

Loan to Vitesse
On 2 September 2013, Hutchinson joined Dutch club Vitesse Arnhem on a season-long loan. On 31 October he made his debut for the club in a league cup game against VV Noordwijk which Vitesse won 5–0. Hutchinson made his league debut on 2 November in a 1–0 win over Ajax coming on as a late substitute. On 2 January 2014 it was announced that he was recalled from his loan spell.

Sheffield Wednesday
On 14 February 2014, Hutchinson joined Championship side Sheffield Wednesday on a 28-day loan. On 14 March 2014, Hutchinson extended his loan with the "Owls" until 9 April 2014.

On 23 May 2014, Chelsea released Hutchinson and made him available for free transfer.

Hutchinson signed a permanent two-year contract with Sheffield Wednesday, on 8 July 2014. In the 2016–17 season, Hutchinson picked up three Player of the Month awards, before signing a new two-and-a-half-year contract in January 2017.

On 24 June 2020, it was announced that he would leave the club when his contract expired on 30 June 2020.

Pafos
On 21 September 2020, following his release from Sheffield Wednesday, Hutchinson joined Cypriot club Pafos. After 7 appearances in all competitions, it was announced that his contract has been terminated on 26 December 2020, following links that he could be about to return to his old club Sheffield Wednesday.

Return to Sheffield Wednesday
After speculation linking him with a return to Sheffield Wednesday, he signed for the club on 25 January 2021. He would make his third debut against Coventry City a few days later. His first goal on his return to the club would be against Derby County on the final day of the season, but the result would eventually see Sheffield Wednesday relegated back to League One. After playing 22 games and only missing one match on his return to the club, it was reported that he had triggered a one-year option in his contract due to the number of games he had played, which was confirmed by the club on 20 May 2021. On 21 May 2022, it was confirmed he would leave the club following the expiration of his contract.

Reading
Hutchinson had a trial with Championship club Reading in July 2022, training with the first team and playing in a few pre-season friendlies. After impressing manager Paul Ince, Hutchinson signed a two-year contract on 20 July 2022, which runs till June 2024.

International career
Hutchinson played for England at under-18 and under-19 youth international level; he missed the 2008 UEFA European Under-19 Football Championship tournament through injury, and would have been the country's captain. Hutchinson was called up to the England under-21 squad on 1 October 2009 for the European Championship qualifier against Macedonia, but withdrew injured.

Style of play
Hutchinson broke through as a defender. His manager at Forest, Sean O'Driscoll, remarked that Hutchinson "can play right-back or right centre-half", adding "he's a bit John Terry-esque". However, during his time at Sheffield Wednesday, he evolved into "an old-fashioned midfielder who marauds into tackles"; Hutchinson believes that since the recovery from his knee injury, he has become "even more full-blooded". After his trio of Player of the Month accolades in 2016–17, the Guardian referred to him as "probably Wednesday's best player [...] and one of the best midfielders in the Championship".

Career statistics

References

1989 births
Living people
Sportspeople from Windsor, Berkshire
English footballers
Association football defenders
England youth international footballers
Chelsea F.C. players
Nottingham Forest F.C. players
SBV Vitesse players
Sheffield Wednesday F.C. players
Pafos FC players
Premier League players
English Football League players
Eredivisie players
Cypriot First Division players
English expatriate footballers
English expatriate sportspeople in the Netherlands
Expatriate footballers in the Netherlands
English expatriate sportspeople in Cyprus
Expatriate footballers in Cyprus
Footballers from Berkshire
Reading F.C. players